Mohammed Al-Khamis (born October 13, 1989) is a Saudi football player who plays for Al-Noor as a midfielder .

References

External links 
 

1989 births
Living people
Saudi Arabian footballers
Hajer FC players
Al-Fayha FC players
Al Jeel Club players
Al-Adalah FC players
Al-Kholood Club players
Al-Riyadh SC players
Al-Qala Club players
Al-Noor FC players
Saudi First Division League players
Saudi Professional League players
Saudi Second Division players
Saudi Third Division players
Association football midfielders
Saudi Arabian Shia Muslims